Brownsville is an unincorporated community in Kitsap County, Washington, United States. It is located north of Bremerton and due east of Silverdale and on the north side of Burke Bay on the Kitsap Peninsula.

Brownsville has a quiet and fairly remote harbor and marina.  The community is primarily residential, but it has a locally famous deli, a convenience store called the Daily Stop, a meat market, and a kayak rental shop.

Brownsville Cemetery
In 2009, an incident of illegal tree cutting brought attention to the historic graveyard located at Roanoke and Roy Streets.

References

External links

Port of Brownsville

Unincorporated communities in Washington (state)
Unincorporated communities in Kitsap County, Washington